Swanville can refer to a place in the United States:

 Swanville, Indiana
 Swanville, Maine
 Swanville, Minnesota
 Swanville Township, Morrison County, Minnesota